The Moura Photovoltaic Power Station (also known as Amareleja Photovoltaic Power Station) is a large photovoltaic power station in Amareleja, in the municipality of Moura, Portugal. It is one of the largest power stations of its kind, and is built in one of the sunniest regions in Europe. Its construction involved two stages: stage 1 was completed in 2008 after 13 months, and stage 2 was completed in 2010. The entire project exceeded a total cost of €250 million.

Stage 2 of the project involved the construction of a further 20 MW of solar panels.

The power station has an installed capacity of 62 MWp, with more than 376,000 solar panels. Approximately 190,000 panels (32 MW) are fitted on fixed structures, and 52,000 panels (10 MW) are fixed on single-axis trackers.

A €7.6 million solar panel factory, located in Moura, was constructed by Acciona, which provided panels for Stage 2 of the station construction. Its future production is targeted at the international market, with a capacity of producing 24 MW of solar panels annually.

See also

 Energy policy of the European Union
 List of largest power stations in the world
 Photovoltaic power stations
 Renewable energy commercialization
 Solar power in Portugal
 Solar power in the European Union

References

External links 
 Slideshow featuring photographs of the solar station
 Two QuickTime VR 360° photos
 Video, in Portuguese, showing several views from the solar station, an interview with AMPER/Acciona director and a quick look at solar panel production at the recently built factory
 June 6, 2008, The Guardian: World's biggest solar farm at centre of Portugal's ambitious energy plan

Photovoltaic power stations in Portugal
Buildings and structures in Moura, Portugal
Buildings and structures in Beja District